The 1976 Princeton Tigers football team was an American football team that represented Princeton University during the 1976 NCAA Division I football season. Princeton tied for last place in the Ivy League.

In their fourth year under head coach Robert Casciola, the Tigers compiled a 2–7 record and were outscored 152 to 63. Daniel E. Fournier was the team captain.

Princeton's 2–5 conference record placed it in a four-way tie for fifth place, at the bottom of the Ivy League standings. The Tigers were outscored 118 to 56 by Ivy opponents.

Princeton played its home games at Palmer Stadium on the university campus in Princeton, New Jersey.

Schedule

References

Princeton
Princeton Tigers football seasons
Princeton Tigers football